Galba (born Servius Sulpicius Galba; 24 December 3 BC – 15 January AD 69) was the sixth Roman emperor, ruling from AD 68 to 69. After his adoption by his stepmother, and before becoming emperor, he was known as  Livius Ocella Sulpicius Galba. He was the first emperor in the Year of the Four Emperors and assumed the throne following Emperor Nero's suicide.

Born into a wealthy family, Galba held at various times the positions of praetor, consul, and governor to the provinces of Aquitania, Upper Germany, and Africa during the first half of the first century AD. He retired from his positions during the latter part of Claudius' reign (with the advent of Agrippina the Younger), but Nero later granted him the governorship of Hispania. Taking advantage of the defeat of Vindex's rebellion and Nero's suicide, he became emperor with the support of the Praetorian Guard.

Galba's physical weakness and general apathy led to him being selected-over by favorites. Unable to gain popularity with the people or maintain the support of the Praetorian Guard, Galba was murdered on the orders of Otho, who became emperor in his place.

Origins and family life
Galba was not related to any of the emperors of the Julio-Claudian dynasty, but he was a member of a distinguished noble family. The origin of the cognomen Galba is uncertain. Suetonius offers a number of possible explanations; the first member of the gens Sulpicia to bear the name might have gotten the name from the term galba, which the Romans used to describe the Gauls, or after an insect called galbae. One of Galba's ancestors had been consul in 200 BC, and another of his ancestors was consul in 144 BC; the later emperor's father and brother, both named Gaius, would hold the office in 5 BC and AD 22 respectively. 
Galba's grandfather was a historian and his son was a barrister whose first marriage was to Mummia Achaica, granddaughter of Quintus Lutatius Catulus and great-granddaughter of Lucius Mummius Achaicus; Galba prided himself on his descent from his great-grandfather Catulus. According to Suetonius, he fabricated a genealogy of paternal descent from the god Jupiter and maternal descent from the legendary Pasiphaë, wife of Minos. Reportedly, Galba was distantly related to Livia to whom he had much respect and in turn by whom he was advanced in his career; in her will she left him fifty million sesterces; Emperor Tiberius however cheated Galba by reducing the amount to five hundred thousand sesterces and never even paid Galba the reduced amount.

Servius Sulpicius Galba was born near Terracina on 24 December 3 BC. His elder brother Gaius fled from Rome and committed suicide because the emperor Tiberius would not allow him to control a Roman province. Livia Ocellina became the second wife of Galba's father, whom she may have married because of his wealth; he was short and hunchbacked. Ocellina adopted Galba, and he took the name Lucius Livius Galba Ocella. Galba had a sexual appetite for males, whom he preferred over females; according to Suetonius, "he was more inclined to ... the hard bodied and those past their prime". Nevertheless, he married a woman named Aemilia Lepida and had two sons. Aemilia and their sons died during the early years of the reign of Claudius (r. 41–54). Galba would remain a widower for the rest of his life.

Public service 
Galba became praetor in about 30, then governor of Aquitania for about a year, then consul in 33. In 39 the emperor Caligula learned of a plot against himself in which Gnaeus Cornelius Lentulus Gaetulicus, the general of the Upper German legions, was an important figure; Caligula installed Galba in the post held by Gaetulicus. According to one report Galba ran alongside Caligula's chariot for twenty miles. As commander of the legions of Upper Germany, Galba gained a reputation as a disciplinarian. Suetonius writes that Galba was advised to take the throne following the assassination of Caligula in 41, but loyally served Caligula's uncle and successor Claudius (r. 41–54); this story may simply be fictional. Galba was appointed as governor of Africa in 44 or 45. He retired at an uncertain time during the reign of Claudius, possibly in 49. He was recalled in 59 or 60 by the emperor Nero (r. 54–68) to govern Hispania.

A rebellion against Nero was orchestrated by Gaius Julius Vindex in Gaul on the anniversary of the death of Nero's mother, Agrippina the Younger, in 68. Shortly afterwards Galba, in rebellion against Nero, rejected the title "General of Caesar" in favor of "General of The Senate and People of Rome". He was supported by the imperial official Tigellinus. At midnight on 8 June, another imperial official, Nymphidius Sabinus, falsely announced to the Praetorian Guard that Nero had fled to Egypt, and the Senate proclaimed Galba emperor. Nero then committed assisted suicide with help from his secretary.

Emperor (June 68)

Rule

Upon becoming emperor, Galba was faced by the rebellion of Nymphidius Sabinus, who had his own aspirations for the imperial throne. However, Sabinus was killed by the Praetorians before he could take the throne. While Galba was arriving to Rome with the Lusitanian governor Marcus Salvius Otho, his army was attacked by a legion that had been organized by Nero; a number of Galba's troops were killed in the fighting. Galba, who suffered from chronic gout by the time he came to the throne, was advised by a corrupt group which included the Spanish general Titus Vinius, the praetorian prefect Cornelius Laco, and Icelus, a freedman of Galba. Galba seized the property of Roman citizens, disbanded the German legions, and did not pay the Praetorians and the soldiers who fought against Vindex. These actions caused him to become unpopular.

Suetonius wrote the following descriptions of Galba's character and physical description:

Particularly bad was his becoming under the influence of Vinius, Laco and Icelus: 

In regard to his appointment of Vitellius to Lower Germany:

Further on his physical appearance and end of reign:

Tacitus (Histories 1.49) comments on the character of Galba: "He seemed too great to be a subject so long as he was subject, and all would have agreed that he was equal to the imperial office if he had never held it."

Suetonius went on to say that Galba was visited by the Roman Goddess Fortuna in his dreams twice, on the latter occasion she "withdrew her support". This happened right before his later downfall.

Mutiny on the frontier and assassination
On 1 January 69, the day Galba and Vinius took the office of consul, the fourth and twenty-second legions of Upper Germany refused to swear loyalty to Galba. They toppled his statues, demanding that a new emperor be chosen. On the following day, the soldiers of Lower Germany also refused to swear their loyalty and proclaimed the governor of the province, Aulus Vitellius, as emperor. Galba tried to ensure his authority as emperor was recognised by adopting the nobleman Lucius Calpurnius Piso Licinianus as his successor. Nevertheless, Galba was killed by the Praetorians on 15 January. Otho was angry that he had been passed over for adoption, and organised a conspiracy with a small number of Praetorian Guards to murder the aged emperor and elevate himself. The soldiery in the capital, composed not just of Praetorians but of Galba's legion from Spain and several detachments of men from the Roman fleet, Illyria, Britain, and Germany, were angered at not having received a donative. They also resented Galba's purges of their officers and fellow soldiers (this was especially true of the men from the fleet). Many in the Praetorian Guard were shaken by the recent murder of their Prefect Nymphidius Sabinus – some of the waverers were convinced to come over to Otho's side out of fear Galba might yet take revenge on them for their connection to Sabinus.

According to Suetonius, Galba put on a linen corset although remarking it was little protection against so many swords; when a soldier claimed to have killed Otho, Galba snapped "On what authority?" He was lured out to the scene of his assassination in the Forum by a false report of the conspirators. Galba either tried to buy his life with a promise of the withheld bounty or asked that he be beheaded. The only help for him was a centurion in the Praetorian Guard named Sempronius Densus, who was killed trying to defend Galba with a pugio; one hundred and twenty persons later petitioned Otho that they had killed Galba; they would be executed by Vitellius. A company of German soldiers to whom he had once done a kindness rushed to help him; however they took a wrong turn and arrived too late. He was killed near the Lacus Curtius. Vinius tried to run away, calling out that Otho had not ordered him killed, but was run through with a spear. Laco was banished to an island where he was later murdered by soldiers of Otho. Icelus was publicly executed. Piso was also killed; his head along with Galba's and Vinius' were placed on poles and Otho was then acclaimed as emperor. Galba's head was brought by a soldier to Otho's camp where camp boys mocked it on a lance – Galba had angered them previously by remarking his vigor was still unimpeded. Vinius' head was sold to his daughter for 2500 drachmas; Piso's head was given to his wife. Galba's head was bought for 100 gold pieces by a freeman who threw it at Sessorium where his master Patrobius Neronianus had been killed by Galba. The body of Galba was taken up by Priscus Helvidius with the permission of Otho; at night  Galba's steward Argivus took both the head and body to a tomb in Galba's private gardens on the Aurelian Way.

References

Citations

Bibliography

Primary sources 

 Cassius Dio, Roman History, fragments of Book 63 (English translation by Earnest Cary on LacusCurtius).
Plutarch, Life of Galba (English translation by A.H. Clough on Wikisource).
Suetonius, The Twelve Caesars, Galba (English translation by John Carew Rolfe on Wikisource).

Secondary sources

External links

 
3 BC births
69 deaths
1st-century BC Romans
1st-century murdered monarchs
1st-century Roman emperors
Ancient Roman adoptees
Ancient Roman military personnel
Imperial Roman consuls
Imperial Roman praetors
Leaders who took power by coup
LGBT Roman emperors
Livii
Murdered Roman emperors
People from the Province of Latina
People of the Year of the Four Emperors
Roman consuls who died in office
Roman emperors murdered by the Praetorian Guard
Roman governors of Hispania Tarraconensis
Roman legates
Roman pharaohs
Sulpicii Galbae